Chet Ram Negi is an Indian politician from Himachal Pradesh. He belongs to the Bharatiya Janata Party.

In 1998, he was elected from Kinnaur district's Kinnaur assembly constituency of Himachal Pradesh.

References 

People from Kinnaur district
Bharatiya Janata Party politicians from Himachal Pradesh
Himachal Pradesh MLAs 1998–2003
Living people
21st-century Indian politicians
Himachal Lokhit Party politicians
Speakers of the Himachal Pradesh Legislative Assembly
Year of birth missing (living people)